Katana are traditionally-made Japanese swords.

Katana may also refer to:

Arts, entertainment and media
Katana (band), Swedish heavy metal band
Katana (web series), a martial arts web series on Strike.TV

Fictional characters and entities
Katana (comics), a DC Comics fictional character
 Katana, a character from Gargoyles animated TV series and comic books 
Katana, a character from the anime series Coyote Ragtime Show
General Katana, a character from the film Highlander II: The Quickening
Katana, a flagship in Star Wars novel Dark Force Rising

People
Randy Katana (born 1965), trance musician from Sint Maarten
Mohamed Katana (born 1999), Kenyan footballer
Stanislav Katana (born 1992) Ukrainian footballer 
Suvad Katana (1969–2005), Bosnian footballer
John Katana, leader of Kenyan band Them Mushrooms

Places
Katana Electoral District, former electoral district in Sri Lanka
Katana Divisional Secretariat
Katana (village), Phillaur, Jalandhar District of Punjab State, India
Qatana, place in Syria, formerly spelled Katana
Qatana District,  District in Syria

Technology
Sanyo Katana, a mobile phone
Katana, a development name for the Dreamcast home video console
Katana (photocopier), a photocopier manufactured by Ricoh
 Katana, a forage harvester machines by Fendt
Katana class engines, by Masten Space Systems
Fender Katana, a guitar
Project Katana, Microsoft Open Web Interface for .NET software
 Katana, lighting and look development software by The Foundry Visionmongers

Transportation
Diamond DA20 Katana, a light aircraft 
Terzi T30 Katana, aerobatic aircraft
UP Katana, a paraglider by UP International
Suzuki Katana, a motorcycle
Suzuki Katana AY50, a scooter
Suzuki Katana, Indonesian version of Suzuki Jimny
Enigma (yacht), formerly Katana, a superyacht

See also
Kitana (disambiguation)
Katanga (disambiguation)
Catania, a city in Sicily
Qatana, a city in Syria
Qatanna, a Palestinian town in the West Bank